Radošević is a Serbo-Croatian surname, derived from the Slavic masculine given name Radoš. It is borne by ethnic Croats and Serbs. In English-language countries may be written as Radosevich. Notable people with the surname include:

 Božidar Radošević (born 1989), Croatian footballer
 Dako Radošević (born 1934), Bosnian former discus thrower
 Leon Radošević (born 1990), Croatian basketball player
 Josip Radošević (born 1994), Croatian footballer
 Miroslav Radošević (born 1973), Serbian former basketball player

Croatian surnames
Serbian surnames